Truth and Purpose is the second album by I, The Breather. The album was released on February 28, 2012, through Sumerian Records. The video for the song "False Profit" was released on May 4, 2012.

Track listing

Members
I The Breather
 Shawn Spann – lead vocals
 Chase Kozlowski – guitar, backing vocals
 Justin Huffman – guitar
 Armand Jasari – bass
 Morgan Wright – drums

References

2012 albums
Sumerian Records albums
I, the Breather albums